The Ngakuru Graben is an area of tectonic ground subsiding as originally defined between the Ngakuru Fault to the east and the Whirinaki Fault in the west both in the Taupō Fault Belt. It was originally defined in 1959 but many other geological terms for local features are no longer in use, and some were misinterpretations. Unhappily both definitions as to width seem current in the literature.

The tectonic activity is driven by the ground subsiding at a rate of 3–4 mm/yr since 61,000 years ago with largely orthogonal rifting associated with subduction and the clockwise rotation of the northern North Island allowing the rift to open.

References

Landforms of Waikato
Taupō Volcanic Zone